Sacconi is an Italian surname. Notable people with the surname include:

 Antonio Sacconi (1895–1968), Italian chess master
 Carlo Sacconi (1808–1889), Cardinal of the Roman Catholic Church and Dean of the College of Cardinals
 Deyvid Sacconi (born 1987), Brazilian footballer
 Giuseppe Sacconi (1854-1905), Italian architect
 Guido Sacconi (born 1948), Italian politician 
 Maurizio Sacconi (born 1950), Italian politician
 Simone Fernando Sacconi (1895–1973), Italian violin maker and restorer

Other
 Sacconi Quartet, UK-based classical music string quartet founded in 2001 

Italian-language surnames